"Bingo" is a song recorded by American rapper Gucci Mane for his second studio album, The State vs. Radric Davis. The song features Soulja Boy Tell 'Em and Waka Flocka Flame, and it was released as the album's fourth single on January 12, 2010, and peaked at number 75 on the US R&B/Hip-Hop chart.

Background
"Worst Enemy" and "Heavy" were originally supposed to be the third and fourth single, however both their releases were cancelled and they only received promotional releases in November 2009. "Lemonade" and "Bingo" took their places and were released in December 2009 and January 2010.

Music video
The video premiered on BET on March 4, 2010. It shows Gucci Mane, Soulja Boy, and Waka Flocka Flame rapping in a parking lot at night. Delicious From Flavor Of Love 2 makes a cameo appearance.

Release and chart performance
"Bingo" was sent to US radio stations in January 2010. Following its release the song debuted on the US Billboard Hot R&B/Hip-Hop Songs charts at number 98. The song peaked at number 75 on that chart.

Charts

References

2009 songs
2010 singles
Gucci Mane songs
Soulja Boy songs
Waka Flocka Flame songs
Song recordings produced by Scott Storch
Songs written by Gucci Mane
Songs written by Soulja Boy
Warner Records singles
Asylum Records singles
Songs written by Waka Flocka Flame
Songs written by Scott Storch